Ānanda (Sanskrit: आनन्द) literally means bliss or happiness. In the Hindu Vedas, Upanishads and Bhagavad gita, ānanda signifies eternal bliss which accompanies the ending of the rebirth cycle. Those who renounce the fruits of their actions and submit themselves completely to the divine will, arrive at the final termination of the cyclical life process (saṃsāra) to enjoy eternal bliss (ānanda) in perfect union with the godhead. The tradition of seeking union with God through loving commitment is referred to as bhakti, or devotion.

Etymology

Ānanda is a Sanskrit word regarded as a verbal noun nanda prefixed with ā. ā indicates the place where the verbal action occurs; for example, āsrama, where one toils, ārama, where one enjoys oneself, ākara, where things are scattered, etc. The word ānanda thus implies a locus, that in which one finds bliss, be it a son, the fulfillment of a wish, the knowledge of brahman, or the atman,. Ānanda is not just a free-floating unfocused bliss, it has an implied object.

Different descriptions of Ānanda in Hindu philosophy

Taittiriya Upanishad 
Perhaps the most comprehensive treatise on 'ānanda' is to be found in the Ananda Valli of Taittiriya Upanishad, where a gradient of pleasures, happiness, and joys is delineated and distinguished from the "ultimate bliss" (ब्रह्मानंद)- absorption in Self-knowledge, a state of non-duality between object and subject. This essential description of 'ānanda' as an aspect of the non-dual Brahman is further affirmed by Adi Shankaracharya commentary on the Brahma Sutras, Chapter 1, Section 1, Shloka 12, आनन्दमयोऽभ्यासात्.

Swami Vivekananda 

Swami Vivekananda has claimed that the reason different meanings of ānanda and different ways of achieving it are present in Hindu philosophy is that humans differ from each other, and each chooses the most appropriate path to ānanda for him or herself.

Sri Aurobindo 

According to Sri Aurobindo, happiness is the natural state of humanity, as he mentions in his book The Life Divine he informs about it as delight of existence. However, mankind develops dualities of pain and pleasure. Aurobindo goes on to say that the concepts of pain and suffering are due to habits developed over time by the mind, which treats success, honour and victory as pleasant things and defeat, failure, misfortune as unpleasant things.

Advaita vedanta 

According to the Vedanta school of Hindu philosophy, ananda is that state of sublime delight when the jiva becomes free from all sins, all doubts, all desires, all actions, all pains, all sufferings and also from all physical and mental ordinary pleasures. Having become established in Brahman it becomes jivanmukta (a being free from the cycle of rebirth). The Upanishads repeatedly use the word Ānanda to denote Brahman, the innermost Self, the Blissful One, which, unlike the individual self, has no real attachments.

Dvaita vedanta 

Based on a reading of the Bhagavad Gita, Dvaita vedanta interprets ananda as happiness derived via good thoughts and good deeds that depend on the state and on the control of the mind. Through evenness of temper and mind, the state of supreme bliss is reached in all aspects of one’s life.

Vishishtadvaita vedanta 

According to the Vishishtadvaita vedanta school which was proposed by Ramanujacharya, true happiness can be only through divine grace, which can be only achieved by surrender of one's ego to the Divine.

Sri Ramana Maharshi 

According to Ramana Maharshi, happiness is within and can be known only through discovering one's true self. He proposes that ananda can be attained by inner enquiry, using the thought "Who am I?"

Ways of achieving ānanda 
Within the various schools of Hindu thought, there are different paths and ways of achieving Happiness. The main four paths are Bhakti yoga, Jnana yoga, Karma yoga and Raja yoga.

See also
Satcitananda
Sukha

References 

Vedanta
Happiness
Sanskrit words and phrases